Eugénio de Castro e Almeida (March 4, 1869 in Coimbra, Portugal – August 17, 1944) was a Portuguese writer and a poet.  He was a professor at the Faculty of Letters at the University of Coimbra and attended Escola Normal Superior in the same university.

His contribution in poetry was divided in two sections: the first symbolic and the second where the author used new rhymes, metric (Alexandrine verses) and richer vocabulary.  The author also written about Ancient classics.

References 

Portuguese poets
Portuguese male poets
1869 births
1944 deaths
People from Coimbra